John DeBellis is an American writer, director and stand-up comedian best known for his work on Saturday Night Live and Politically Incorrect. In addition he wrote and directed the film The Last Request and is a frequent contributor to The Huffington Post.
He has written the book Standup Guys about his rising star friends including Larry David, Richard Lewis, Richard Belzer, Bill Maher, Gilbert Gottfried, Rita Rudner, Joe Piscopo, Paul Reiser, and Jerry Seinfeld.

Filmography
Last Request 2006

References

External links
Official website
John DeBellis at The Huffington Post

American male comedians
American male screenwriters
American television writers
Living people
American male television writers
Year of birth missing (living people)
Place of birth missing (living people)
21st-century American comedians
21st-century American screenwriters
21st-century American male writers